I Am the King (also known as I Am a King) is a 2012 South Korean historical comedy film, starring Ju Ji-hoon, Park Yeong-gyu, Baek Yoon-sik, Byun Hee-bong and Kim Su-ro. Inspired by Mark Twain's 1881 novel The Prince and the Pauper, the film is set in the Joseon Dynasty with Ju playing the dual role of a king and a beggar. It was released on August 8, 2012 and ran for 120 minutes.

Background
The movie depicts the three months before Choong-nyung (the future Sejong the Great) becomes king. The Annals of the Joseon Dynasty, which follow the history of the Joseon Dynasty between 1413 and 1865, leave out records of this crucial period. While to future generations King Sejong would stand as a legendary figure for his creation of the Korean alphabet and advancing the country’s scientific research and law, as Prince Choong-nyung he was known to be a bit of a reclusive bookworm.

Plot
When his older brothers Yangnyeong and Hyoryeong fail to impress their father King Taejong, the king makes a royal command for Choong-nyung to become the next ruler of the kingdom instead. The prince, who strongly refuses to become the king and just wants to live a happy and stress-free life buried in his books, chooses to escape the palace before his coronation ceremony.

After hours of contemplation, Choong-nyung escapes by climbing over the palace wall. There he runs into a bad-tempered drunken slave named Deok-chil, who happens to be at the palace to save the love of his life who was captured by government officials and put in prison for being the daughter of a suspected spy.

Deok-chil perfectly resembles the prince, so Choong-nyung instantly grabs the chance to disguise himself as a slave and they exchange clothes with each other. In a terrible twist of fate, when Choong-nyung wakes up after being knocked unconscious, he is mistaken for a slave and Deok-chil gets put on the throne. As Choong-nyung ventures outside the palace walls, he begins to open his eyes to the people living in extreme poverty and experiences the life of the common man.

Cast
Ju Ji-hoon as Grand Prince Choong-nyung / Duk-Chil
Baek Yoon-sik as Hwang-Hee
Byun Hee-bong as Shin-Ik
Park Yeong-gyu as King Taejong
Im Won-hee as Hae-Koo
Lee Hanee as Soo-Yeon
Kim Su-ro as Hwang-Koo
Baek Do-bin as Grand Prince Yang-nyung
Im Hyung-joon as Jang Young-shil
Kim Eung-soo as an old butcher
Kim So-hyun as Sol-Bi
Han Yeo-wool as a virgin
Lee Mi-do as the Crown Princess Consort
Yoon Kyung-ho as Geun-Bae
Kwon Hyuk-soo as Soo Yeon-boo
Lee Dae-gwang as Tteok seller 1
Lee Jung-hoon as Tteok seller 2
Kim Wang-geun as Lee-Bang
Yang Myung-hun as Hwang-Hee's warrior
Jang Tae-min as a Slave
Byun Joo-hyun as a Royal officer
Jung-Woon as Yang-nyung's group
Ham Jin-sung as Yang-nyung's group
Lee Chul-hee
Im Hak-soon

Special screening
On August 13, 2012, a special screening was held at Deoksu Palace in Seoul, the first Korean movie screened outdoors on the palace grounds. Some 500 citizens as well as independence fighters and their families were in attendance. The event marked National Liberation Day, which commemorates Korea's independence from Japanese colonial rule.

Reception
The film ranked third and grossed  in its first week of release, and grossed a total of  domestically after two weeks of screening.

References

External links
 I Am the King official website 
 
 

2012 films
2010s historical comedy films
South Korean historical comedy films
Films set in the Joseon dynasty
Lotte Entertainment films
2010s Korean-language films
Films based on The Prince and the Pauper
2010s South Korean films